Khaneh Hay Chahar Shanbeh (also Romanized as Khāneh Hāy-e Chahār Shanbeh) is a village in Kambel-e Soleyman Rural District, in the Central District of Chabahar County, Sistan and Baluchestan Province, Iran. At the 2006 census, its population was 399, in 79 families.

References 

Populated places in Chabahar County